An outbreak of smallpox occurred in the city of Wrocław in Poland in the summer of 1963. The disease was brought to Poland by an officer in the Ministry of Public Security who had returned from India. The epidemic lasted for two months, causing 99 people to fall ill and seven to die. It caused Wrocław to close and quarantine itself.

It was one of the last smallpox outbreaks in Europe (the 1972 Yugoslav smallpox outbreak was last).

Patient zero
The officer who brought the virus was a lieutenant colonel, Bonifacy Jedynak. He had returned from India (or according to some sources, either Burma or Vietnam) on 22 May 1963 and became infected by an unknown disease. He went to the hospital of the interior ministry in Wrocław where he was diagnosed with malaria. He recovered in hospital and was discharged, but unknowingly also carried smallpox, managing to infect one hospital worker with it.

Diagnosis
Lonia Kowalczyk was the first person who died because of the infection. On 15 July 1963, an anti-epidemic emergency was announced in the city, 47 days after the first case of the disease. 10,000 vaccines were delivered from the Polish capital Warsaw that day.

Closure of the city

Vaccination treatments and end of epidemic

References

Smallpox epidemics
Smallpox eradication
Smallpox
History of Wrocław
1963 disease outbreaks
Disease outbreaks in Poland
1963 disasters in Poland